Churruca is a town in Tres de Febrero Partido of Buenos Aires Province, Argentina. It is located in the Greater Buenos Aires urban agglomeration.

External links

Populated places in Buenos Aires Province
Tres de Febrero Partido